Rhame Township is a civil township in Bowman County in the U.S. state of North Dakota. As of the 2010 census, its population was 27.

References

Townships in Bowman County, North Dakota
Townships in North Dakota